Margaret Wallace (born May 30, 1967) is an American entrepreneur, gaming and media professional. In 2009, she co-founded Playmatics with Nicholas Fortugno in New York, New York. The company focuses on bringing new kinds of immersive experiences to casual gamers.  In 2006, she was named one of the hundred most influential women in the game industry.

Education 
While in high school, Wallace participated in the Congress-Bundestag Youth Exchange Scholarship, which allows students to study a year abroad in Germany. Under the scholarship, she attended a one-month language and cultural preparation course at The Experiment in International Living (now World Learning) in Brattleboro, Vermont and spent her final year of high school at the Gymnasium Mellendorf in Mellendorf, Lower Saxony, Germany.

As an undergraduate, she attended Boston University, where she studied Communication and Philosophy and received a Bachelor of Science with Distinction in 1989.  Wallace subsequently studied Communication and Cultural Theory at the University of Massachusetts Amherst, earning an MA in 1996.

Career 
After Boston, Wallace moved to San Francisco, California, where she became professionally involved in the Internet and gaming, particularly casual games.

PF.Magic 
In 1996, Wallace joined PF Magic, a video game developer founded in 1991 and located in San Francisco, CA.  Though it developed other types of video games, PF.Magic was arguably best known for its virtual pet games, such as Dogz, Catz, and Oddballz; Wallace participated in the development of:

Catz II: Your Virtual Petz (1997)
Dogz 2: Your Virtual Petz (1997)
Oddballz: Your Wacky Computer Petz (1996)
The Petz Web Fun Pack

Mindscape 
After Mindscape, Inc.’s acquisition of PF.Magic in early 1998, Wallace continued employment with the company’s online content group.  The Learning Company (TLC) acquired Mindscape, Inc. in March 1998 for $150 million. Mattel soon purchased TLC in 1999 for $3.8 billion, renaming it "Mattel Interactive".

The copyright on the Petz, Oddballz and Babyz titles was eventually acquired by Ubisoft.  Currently, Petz is Ubisoft's number six top-selling brand, having sold over thirteen million units to date.

Shockwave.com 
In 1999, Wallace joined Shockwave.com—then operating under its early name, Shockrave.com.  There she produced some of the company's most popular titles, including Shockwave Tetris, Blix, Shockwave Jigsaw Puzzles, and content for Photo Greetings and Jigsaw Puzzle Maker.

For the 2000 Shockwave Tetris game, Wallace worked closely with Blue Planet Software on staying true to the Tetris brand.  She also incorporated a techno soundtrack to this version of Tetris, having a techno version of the Tetris theme song composed. She also worked with Astralwerks Records who provided a track from Q-Burns Abstract Message called "Feng Shui" for the game. Beatnik, Inc. was the primary music provider for this version of Tetris. The game had a unique sonified accompaniment that is customized to a player's individual gameplay and skill level.

Skunk Studios 
In 2001, Wallace went on to Co-Found and become chief executive officer of Skunk Studios.  Formed by all former employees of Shockwave.com, Skunk Studios was one of the first to call itself a casual game company.  Skunk Studios is best known for titles including:

Varmintz
QBeez
QBeez 2
Gutterball
Gutterball 2
Tennis Titans
Tennis Titans 2
Mah Jong Adventures
Spelvin
Word Up
Sveerz
Tamale Loco: Rumble in the Desert II

Rebel Monkey 
In 2007, Wallace cofounded and become chief executive officer of Rebel Monkey Inc., a New York City-based entertainment company focused on providing new kinds of real-time immersive play for casual gamers. The company was cofounded with Nicholas Fortugno, lead designer behind the original Diner Dash game brand.  In October 2007, the company secured an initial round of investment from Redpoint Ventures.  In early 2009, Rebel Monkey announced the launch of casual Massively multiplayer online game CampFu and the Monkey Wrench gaming platform on which it is built.

CampFu
CampFu is an online virtual world with a summer camp theme.  Emphasizing collaborative team play and aimed at the teenaged demographic, CampFu officially launched on March 17, 2009, after a beta stage that began in February of the same year. CampFu is free to play, but users can access premium content by purchasing in-world currency called FuCash and/or a VIP membership subscription.  Users can also earn Tickets, which can be exchanged for clothing items, by playing CampFu games.  Games currently playable include:

Veg-Out
WordMob
Fungeez
Critter Smackdown

Rebel Monkey Inc. closed permanently after it failed to secure subsequent funding during the economic downturn in Summer 2009.

Playmatics 
In September 2009, Wallace and Nick Fortugno started a new company focused on game design and development called Playmatics, LLC.  In 2010, Playmatics created the Fortugno-designed interactive comic "The Interrogation" for the television series Breaking Bad. The game went on to be recognized for a CableFAX Best of the Web award. Other titles by Playmatics include Disney's The Kingdom Keepers "Race to Save the Magic."

Shadow Government, Inc. 
In 2011, Wallace and Fortugno co-founded Shadow Government, Inc along with Philippe Trawnika. Shadow Government, Inc. is dedicated to bringing new forms of social gaming based on gamifying real countries, systems, and worldwide events.

Public speaking 
Wallace is a frequent speaker on the state of the industry, business and casual and online games at conferences such as the Game Developers Conference/San Francisco, GC Developers Conference (Leipzig), Casual Connect, The Austin Game Conference, and the LA and NY Games Conference.  She delivered a keynote on gamification at nextMedia Toronto. She was also a keynote speaker at the ICEC 2006.

In print 
Co-Editor, IGDA Casual Games White Paper 2006
Data Collection, The Social and Cultural Aspects of VCR Use
Interviewee, Creating Casual Games for Profit and Fun

Memberships and affiliations 
Member of the International Academy of Digital Arts and Sciences
Steering Committee member for the International Game Developers Association Casual Game Special Interest Group (2005–2008)
Adjunct Faculty of Parsons the New School of Design
Screen Burn Advisory Committee

External links 
Playmatics
Shadow Government, Inc.
Rebel Monkey, Inc.
CampFu
Rebel Monkey raises $1M Investment
More details on Rebel Monkey project as it hires CTO
Gamasutra's coverage of Wallace's talk at the Austin Game Developers' Conference 2008—"If You Build It, Will They Come?"
Margaret Wallace interviewed in Gamasutra
Interview with Margaret Wallace in Business Week
Radio Interview with Margaret Wallace for National Association for Women in Technology
Radio Interview with Margaret Wallace on Shift Radio
Interview in Edge Online
Interview with Margaret Wallace in Edge Online

References 

Video game businesspeople
1967 births
Living people